Bethany is a Calvinistic Methodist chapel in Ammanford, Carmarthenshire, Wales. Services are conducted in the Welsh language.

The chapel was founded around 1880 and was originally  a branch of the older Methodist cause across the river in Betws. A committee was formed and land acquired in Wind Street from Lord Dynevor. The new chapel was built at a cost of £900 and the first service was held in 1881

Membership increased with the development of the town, with a particularly flourishing period during the ministry of W. Nantlais Williams, a noted poet and hymn writer, who was their minister from 1900 to 1944. Following the religious revival of 1904–1904, Nantlais gave up all involvement with competitive eisteddfodau to concentrate on pastoral work.

By the 1920s the chapel was considered too small, and a decision to rebuild was taken in 1927. Bethany was re-opened in 1929 with seating capacity at 800, with room for another 300 in the adjoining vestry. The work was completed by William Evans, a local contractor and member of the Ammanford Urban District Council.

References

Sources

Chapels in Carmarthenshire